Oliver Hunter (born 1934) is a Guyanese sprinter. He competed in the men's 100 metres and men's 200 metres at the 1956 Summer Olympics.

References

External links
 

1934 births
Living people
Athletes (track and field) at the 1956 Summer Olympics
Guyanese male sprinters
Olympic athletes of British Guiana
Place of birth missing (living people)